Three Songs to Poems by Thomas Hardy is a set of songs for voice and piano composed in 1925 by John Ireland (18791962). It consists of settings of three poems by Thomas Hardy (18401928).

A performance of all three songs takes around 7 minutes. The songs are:

 "Summer Schemes" (from Late Lyrics and Earlier with Many Other Verses (1922))
 "Her Song" (from Late Lyrics and Earlier with Many Other Verses)
 "Weathers"

References 

Song cycles by John Ireland
1925 compositions
Musical settings of poems by Thomas Hardy